Frank A. Dunn is a Canadian business executive who was the chief executive officer of Nortel Networks. In 2007, the U.S. Securities and Exchange Commission filed civil fraud charges against him, and three former senior executives, in a wide-ranging financial fraud scheme.

Dunn joined Nortel Networks (when it was still known as Northern Electric) as a management trainee in 1976, after graduating from McGill University.  He was appointed CFO in 1999 under CEO John Roth. After Roth retired, Dunn became the CEO in November 2001 until he was fired for cause, along with several financial executives in April 2004.

On June 19, 2008, Dunn (then aged 54) was arrested by the Royal Canadian Mounted Police, along with two other former Nortel executives, charged with fraud affecting the public market, falsification of books and documents and producing a false prospectus.

On January 14, 2013, Dunn was found not guilty of falsifying financial reports in what prosecutors said was a scheme to report profits and gain bonuses. This came four years to the day after Nortel sought bankruptcy protection and began liquidating.

On December 19, 2014,  remaining civil charges from the OSC and SEC were simultaneously dropped against Dunn and several of his former colleagues.  Ultimately, no civil or criminal charges were successfully brought against Dunn or any others individuals  connected to the Nortel accounting scandal.

References

Canadian chief executives
McGill University alumni
Year of birth missing (living people)
Living people
Place of birth missing (living people)
Canadian corporate directors
Directors of Nortel
Canadian telecommunications industry businesspeople
Chief executives in the technology industry
Chief financial officers